Brazil vs. Exeter City F.C. was the first match involving the Brazil national football team. The match was part of the Exeter City tour of South America where the team played against Argentine and Brazilian teams, just like other British clubs toured before and after during the first years of football in the region.

History 
The match was played on July 21, 1914 on the field of Fluminense FC, located at Rua das Laranjeiras, in a high class area on ​​the south side of Rio de Janeiro. Brazil played Exeter City, then a third tier club in England, who were touring South America.

The newly formed Brazilian Sports Federation, FBS, brought together the best players in Rio de Janeiro and São Paulo. Among those called up were great early names of Brazilian football: Marcos de Mendonça, Friedenreich, Abelardo De Lamare, Rubens Salles and Sílvio Lagreca.

Exeter had previously won two friendlies in Rio de Janeiro - first, they won 3–0 against English players who competed in the sport's championships in Rio de Janeiro, and then overcame Rio de Janeiro 5–3 - and were favourites to win. However, in a display of skill and technique that surprised the Exeter City players, Brazil beat their opponents 2-0, with goals from Oswaldo Gomes – the first in the team's history – and Osman, both in the first half of the match. Astonished and powerless to react, the English resorted to violence. Despite the appetite of their foreign rivals, light and leisurely football by Brazilians prevailed.

More than a hundred years later, Exeter City is proud to have participated in the birth of the Brazil national team. At its home stadium, St James Park in Exeter, the Britons have hoisted the flags of Brazil. From the stands, one of The Grecians (The Greeks) fans' songs alludes to the historic clash with Brazil:

Match details

See also 

History of the Brazil national football team
History of Exeter City F.C.
Brazil national football team results (unofficial matches)
British football clubs tours to South America

References  

Brazil national football team matches
Exeter City F.C. matches
1914 in Brazilian football